Mihai Dolgan (14 March 1942 – 16 March 2008) was a singer and composer from Moldova. In 1967 he set up the Noroc which became one of the most famous bands in the Soviet Union.

Biography
Mihail Dolgan was born on March 14, 1942, in Vladimirești of the Sângerei District. In 1949 all his family was deported to Siberia. He came back to Moldova in 1957. In 1967 Mihai Dolgan set up the Noroc ensemble, which became one of the most famous in the USSR. In 1970 the Ministry of Culture of the Moldavian Soviet Socialist Republic banned the ensemble and it returned onto the stage only in 1988. Mihai Dolgan is the author of about a hundred compositions, which became hits. On March 16, 2008, the composer Mihai Dolgan died in the hospital, suffering from an incurable disease. Mihai Dolgan was buried at the Armenian cemetery.

Awards
 People's Artist, 1988 
 Order of the Republic (Moldova), the highest state award, 2001

Bibliography
 Iurie Colesnic. Chișinău. Enciclopedie.1997 
 Serafim Buzilă. Interpreți din Moldova. Ch., Ed. Arc-Museum, 1996, reeditare 1999

Discography 
 ВИА «Норок» (1968)
 ВИА «Норок» (1969)
 Ансамбль «Норок» (1987)

References

1942 births
2008 deaths
Moldovan composers
People from Sîngerei District
Moldovan prisoners and detainees
Soviet prisoners and detainees
20th-century Moldovan male singers
21st-century Moldovan male singers
20th-century composers
21st-century composers
Male composers
People's Artists of Moldova